Tasmania Devils Football Club may refer to:

 Tasmania Devils Football Club (VFL), Australian rules football team that competed in the Victorian Football League between 2001 and 2008 
 Tasmania Devils (NAB League), Australian rules football team that has competed in the NAB League Boys competition since 2019 and the NAB League Girls competition since 2021